Suviseshapuram is a community in the Tirunelveli district in Tamil Nadu state in southern India.

It was started by Edward Sargent Assistant Bishop in the historic Diocese of Madras. and was centred around the Anglican church.

The most celebrated festival in this village is the  harvestfestival. in it, the song Annai mari bala is played everywhere . In the same town, a young man named David is making the town song by remaking the Traditional songs given by his ancestors..

Notes

Villages in Tirunelveli district